Heinemann Vogelstein (February 13, 1841 - August 4, 1911) was a German rabbi and leader of Reform Judaism in Germany.

Biography
Heinemann Vogelstein was born in Lippe on February 13, 1841, the son of Julie (née Adler) and Israel Vogelstein. In 1859, he began his studies at University of Wroclaw and then at the Jewish Theological Seminary of Breslau where he received his PhD in 1865 (his thesis was entitled 'Die Alexandersage bei den Orientalen). In 1861, he became a member of the Hochschule für die Wissenschaft des Judentums.

He was rabbi in Pilsen (1868-1880) and Stettin (from 1880 until his death), founder and chairman (until his death) of the Vereinigung der liberalen Rabbiner (Union of Liberal Rabbis) and Deputy Chairman of the Vereinigung für das Liberale Judentum in Deutschland (Union for Liberal Judaism in Germany). From 1894 to 1896 he published a book of prayers in two volumes in which all references to Jewish nationalism had been eliminated.

As an opponent of Zionism he joined the protest movement in 1897 and published a pamphlet in 1906 entitled Der Zionismus, eine Gefahr für die gedeihliche Entwickelung des Judentums (Zionism, a Danger to the Prosperous Development of Judaism). In 1889, he wrote Kampf zwischen Priestern und Leviten seit den Tagen Ezechiels (Struggle between priests and the Levites since the days of Ezekiel).

In 1928, a street was named after him in Szczecin.

Personal life
Vogelstein was the father of Hermann Vogelstein, Ludwig Vogelstein, Theodor Vogelstein, and Julie Braun-Vogelstein. He died on August 4, 1911 in St. Moritz.

References

 Helge Dvorak: Biographisches Lexikon der Deutschen Burschenschaft. Bd. 1, Teilbd. 8, Supplement L–Z. Winter, Heidelberg 2014, S. 358–360.
 Chajim David Lippe: Bibliographisches Lexicon der gesammten jüdischen Literatur der Gegenwart und Adress-Anzeiger. Löwy, Wien 1881; Neue Serie, Wien 1899
 Georg Herlitz und Bruno Kirschner: Jüdisches Lexikon.Band 4,2, Jüdischer Verlag,  Berlin 1927.
 Salomon Wininger: Große jüdische National-Biographie. Volume 6, Orient [u. a.], Cernãuţi 1936
 Philo-Lexikon. Handbuch des jüdischen Wissens. 4th edition, Philo-Verlag, Berlin [u. a.] 1937
 Encyclopaedia Judaica. Band 16, Encyclopaedia Judaica, Jerusalem 1971
 Ernst G. Lowenthal: Juden in Preußen. Reimer, Berlin 1981
 Rudolf M. Wlaschek: Biographia Judaica Bohemiae. Band 1, Forschungsstelle Ostmitteleuropa, Dortmund 1995 (= Veröffentlichungen der Forschungsstelle Ostmitteleuropa an der Universität Dortmund, Band 52)
 Walther Killy and Rudolf Vierhaus (publishers): Deutsche Biographische Enzyklopädie. Volume 10, Saur, München [u. a.] 1999.
 Eintrag VOGELSTEIN, Heinemann,Dr. In Michael Brocke and Julius Carlebach (Herausgeber), bearbeitet von Carsten Wilke: Biographisches Handbuch der Rabbiner. Teil 1: Die Rabbiner der Emanzipationszeit in den deutschen, böhmischen und großpolnischen Ländern 1781–1871.  K·G·Saur, Munich 2004, S. 873f.

1841 births
1911 deaths
Anti-Zionist Reform rabbis
German Reform rabbis
People from Lippe